Jeff Curchin (December 17, 1947 – June 16, 2011) was an American football tackle and guard. He played for the Chicago Bears from 1970 to 1971 and for the Buffalo Bills in 1972.

He died on June 16, 2011, in Valrico, Florida at age 63.

References

1947 births
2011 deaths
American football tackles
American football guards
Florida State Seminoles football players
Players of American football from Florida
Sportspeople from Ocala, Florida
Chicago Bears players
Buffalo Bills players